Rucas is an Italian ski resort and village in the municipality of Bagnolo Piemonte, in Piedmont.

References

External links
 

Frazioni of the Province of Cuneo